Stigmella stelviana is a moth of the family Nepticulidae. It is endemic to the Alps, where it is found at altitudes between 1,900 and 2,600 meters.

The larvae feed on Potentilla crantzii, Potentilla frigida and Potentilla grandiflora. They mine the leaves of their host plant. The mine consists of a corridor that strongly widens in the end, and may occupy an entire leaf segment. Initially, the frass is concentrated in a frequently interrupted central line. Later it becomes irregularly scattered.

External links
Fauna Europaea
bladmineerders.nl

Nepticulidae
Moths of Europe
Moths described in 1938